is a 103 kilometer (64 mile) long river in Hiroshima Prefecture, Japan. The river is one of the major rivers in the prefecture and descends through steep topography, with hydroelectric power plants situated along the river.

Ōta River has numerous tributaries and branches into the delta area of Hiroshima which comprises Tenma, Kyūōta/Honkawa, Motoyasu, Kyōbashi, and Enkō rivers.

Originally, the Ōta River passes through the western side of Aioi Bridge which was the aiming point for the atomic bombing of Hiroshima. A flood control channel was built along the former Yamate river in the late 1960s, which became the main passageway of the Ōta River. The original passageway of the Ōta River is now known as the Kyūōta River (旧太田川, Kyūōta-gawa, lit. "Old Ōta") or Honkawa River (本川, Honkawa).

Ōta River runs through the municipalities of Hatsukaichi, Akiota, Kitahiroshima, Akitakata, Higashihiroshima and Hiroshima. The size of its catchment area is 1,710 km².

See also 

 Sandan-kyō - a ravine located in a tributary river of the Ōta River.

References

External links 
 Ootagawa - Ministry of Land, Infrastructure, Transport and Tourism (in Japanese)

 
Rivers of Hiroshima Prefecture
Rivers of Japan